The 2018 PSL season was the sixth season of the Philippine Super Liga (PSL). It introduced its first all-star weekend and a fourth indoor tournament, the Collegiate Grand Slam Conference, featuring collegiate women's teams.

Indoor Volleyball

Grand Prix

Standing:

|}

Playoffs:

Final standing:

Awards:

Invitational

Group A standing:

|}

Group B standing:

|}

Playoffs:

Final standing:

Individual awards:

All-Filipino

Preliminary round:

|}
Second round Group A:

|}
Second round Group B:

|}
Playoffs:

Final standing:

Individual awards:

Collegiate Grand Slam

Preliminary round:

|}
Final standing:

Individual awards:

Beach Volleyball

Women's

Playoffs:

Final standing:

Men's

Playoffs:

Final standing:

All-star weekend
The PSL staged its all-star weekend at Silay, Negros Occidental on May 18 to 19, 2018, where two all-star games were played. The games were not televised.

Brand ambassador
Aby Maraño (2017 to 2018)
 Rachel Anne Daquis (2018 to 2019)

Broadcast partners
 TV5, AksyonTV, ESPN5.com

References

Philippine Super Liga
PSL
PSL